Lambda Leonis (λ Leonis, abbreviated Lam Leo, λ Leo), formally named Alterf , is a star in the constellation of Leo. The star is bright enough to be seen with the naked eye, having an apparent visual magnitude of 4.32 Based upon an annual parallax shift of 0.00991 arcseconds, it is located about 329 light-years from the Sun. At that distance, the visual magnitude of the star is reduced by an interstellar absorption factor of 0.06 because of extinction.

Nomenclature 

λ Leonis (Latinised to Lambda Leonis) is the star's Bayer designation.

It bore the traditional name Alterf, from the Arabic الطرف aṭ-ṭarf "the view (of the lion)". In 2016, the International Astronomical Union (IAU) organized a Working Group on Star Names (WGSN) to catalogue and standardize proper names for stars. The WGSN approved the name Alterf for this star on February 1, 2017 and it is now so included in the List of IAU-approved Star Names.

This star, along with Xi Cancri, were the Persian Nahn, "the Nose", and the Coptic Piautos, "the Eye", both lunar asterisms.

Properties 

This is a K-type giant star with a stellar classification of K4.5 III. It is a suspected variable star with a reported magnitude range of 4.28−4.34. It shines with around 472 times the luminosity of the Sun, from an outer atmosphere that has an effective temperature of 3,900 K.

References

K-type giants
Leo (constellation)
Alterf
Leonis, Lambda
Leonis, 04
046750
Suspected variables
082308
3773
Durchmusterung objects